Dorcadion veluchense is a species of beetle in the family Cerambycidae. It was described by Pic in 1903. It is known from Greece.

References

veluchense
Beetles described in 1903